Shawn Long (born January 29, 1993) is an American professional basketball player for Levanga Hokkaido of the Japanese B.League. He played college basketball for the University of Louisiana at Lafayette and represented the United States at the 2015 Pan American Games in Toronto.

High school career
Long attended Morgan City High School under Jeremy Whittington. As a senior, he averaged 21.4 points, 15.2 rebounds and 9.1 blocks, helping team to a 26–5 record. He was named district MVP, earned first team all-district honors for two straight year and was the district defensive player of the year as a senior.

College career
Long originally enrolled at Mississippi State University of the Southeastern Conference, but became immediately unhappy with his choice. After the first semester, and without playing in any games, Long transferred to Louisiana–Lafayette and received an NCAA waiver to allow him to play the following season without sitting out the customary full year. Long first suited up for the Ragin' Cajuns in the 2012–13 season, averaging 15.5 points and 10.2 rebounds per game to earn Sun Belt Conference Freshman of the Year and second-team All-conference honors. Over his next two seasons, Long would again average a double-double and was named first-team All-Sun Belt both years.

For his senior season, Long was named the preseason Sun Belt Player of the Year. On January 23, 2016, in a game against the Troy Trojans, Long scored his 2,000th point and became the first player in school and conference history to record 2,000 points and 1,000 rebounds for his career. He was also selected for the National Association of Basketball Coaches (NABC) college All-Star game to be held at the 2016 Final Four in Houston.

Professional career

Delaware and Philadelphia (2016–2017)
After going undrafted in the 2016 NBA draft, Long signed with the Philadelphia 76ers on July 8, 2016. He was waived by the 76ers on October 24 after appearing in seven preseason games. Five days later, he was acquired by the Delaware 87ers of the NBA Development League as an affiliate player of the 76ers. On January 6, 2017, Long had 45 points and 14 rebounds in a 129–105 win over the Erie BayHawks. He was selected to play in the 2017 NBA D-League All-Star Game. On March 6, 2017, he was called up by the 76ers, who signed him to a 10-day contract to help the team deal with numerous injuries. Philadelphia had to use an NBA hardship exemption in order to sign him as he made their roster stand at 16, one over the allowed limited of 15. He made his NBA debut that night, recording 13 points and seven rebounds in a 112–98 loss to the Milwaukee Bucks. On March 16, 2017, he signed a partially guaranteed, multiyear deal with the 76ers. Seven days later, in a 117–107 win over the Chicago Bulls, Long had 18 points in just his ninth career game.

On June 28, 2017, Long was traded to the Houston Rockets in exchange for a 2018 second-round pick and cash considerations. He was waived by the Rockets on September 26, 2017.

China and G League (2017–2018)
On October 10, 2017, Long signed a two-month contract with the Xinjiang Flying Tigers of the Chinese Basketball Association. He left the team in mid-November after averaging 12.7 points and 6.1 rebounds in seven games.

On December 18, 2017, Long was acquired by the Delaware 87ers of the NBA G League.

New Zealand Breakers and Guizhou Guwutang Tea (2018–2019)
On September 5, 2018, Long signed with the New Zealand Breakers for the 2018–19 NBL season. He averaged 18.3 points, 8.9 rebounds and 1.5 blocks per game and was named to the All-NBL Second Team.

In May 2019, Long had a one-game stint with Guizhou Guwutang Tea of the Chinese NBL.

Melbourne United (2019–2020)
On May 30, 2019, Long signed with Melbourne United for the 2019–20 NBL season.

Ulsan Mobis Phoebus (2020–2021)
On June 16, 2020, Long signed with Ulsan Mobis Phoebus of the Korean Basketball League (KBL). He averaged 21.3 points and 10.9 rebounds per game, ranking No. 1 in both scoring and rebounding. He was subsequently named the KBL's Foreign MVP for the 2020–21 season.

Levanga Hokkaido (2021–present)
On June 18, 2021, Long signed with Levanga Hokkaido of the B.League.

National team career
Long represented the United States national team at the 2015 Pan American Games, where he won a bronze medal.

Career statistics

NBA

Regular season

|-
| style="text-align:left;"| 
| style="text-align:left;"| Philadelphia
| 18 || 0 || 12.7 || .594 || .412 || .543 || 4.5 || .8 || .5 || .5 || 8.2
|-
| style="text-align:center;" colspan="2"| Career
| 18 || 0 || 12.7 || .594 || .412 || .543 || 4.5 || .8 || .5 || .5 || 8.2

B.League

Regular season

|-
| style="text-align:left;"| 2021-22
| style="text-align:left;"| Hokkaido
| 56 || 56 || 32.5 || .573 || .392 || .676 || 10.5 || 2.5 || 1.1 || 1.0 || 25.0
|-
| style="text-align:center;" colspan="2"| Career
| 56 || 56 || 32.5 || .573 || .392 || .676 || 10.5 || 2.5 || 1.1 || 1.0 || 25.0

Source: basketball-stats.de (Date: 27. May 2022)

Personal life
Long's sister, Shelly, died in 2018 after suffering from an autoimmune disease.

See also
 List of NCAA Division I men's basketball players with 2000 points and 1000 rebounds
 List of NCAA Division I men's basketball career rebounding leaders

External links

Louisiana–Lafayette Ragin' Cajuns bio
Basketball-Stats Shawn Longs Profile

References

1993 births
Living people
American expatriate basketball people in Australia
American expatriate basketball people in China
American expatriate basketball people in New Zealand
American men's basketball players
Basketball players at the 2015 Pan American Games
Basketball players from Louisiana
Centers (basketball)
Delaware 87ers players
Levanga Hokkaido players
Louisiana Ragin' Cajuns men's basketball players
Melbourne United players
New Zealand Breakers players
Pan American Games bronze medalists for the United States
Pan American Games medalists in basketball
People from Morgan City, Louisiana
Philadelphia 76ers players
Power forwards (basketball)
Undrafted National Basketball Association players
Xinjiang Flying Tigers players
Medalists at the 2015 Pan American Games
United States men's national basketball team players